The 1983 OFC Women's Championship was the first OFC Women's Championship of association football (also known as the OFC Women's Nations Cup).

First stage

Final

Awards

References

External links
 OFC Site

1983
OFC
Women
1983
1983 in New Zealand association football
1983 in Australian soccer
November 1983 sports events in Oceania
December 1983 sports events in Oceania
Sports competitions in Nouméa
20th century in Nouméa